South West Bay Airport is an airport in South West Bay, Malakula, Vanuatu .

Airlines and destinations

References

Airports in Vanuatu
Malampa Province